Dorsch may refer to:

Surname

Niklas Dorsch, German footballer
Käthe Dorsch (1890–1957), German actress
Franz Xaver Dorsch (1899–1986), German civil engineer
Susan Dorsch (born 1935), Australian physician and educator
Travis Dorsch, American football player

Other

Dorsch's White Cross Bakery, listed on the National Register of Historic Places in Washington, D.C.